This is a non-exhaustive list of Azerbaijan women's international footballers – association football players who have appeared at least once for the senior Azerbaijan women's national football team.

Players

See also 
 Azerbaijan women's national football team

References 

 
International footballers
Women
Azerbaijani International footballers
Football in Azerbaijan
Association football player non-biographical articles